Lady Yin (Chinese: 殷氏; Pinyin: Yīn Shì) is a character featured within the famed classic Chinese novel Fengshen Yanyi. She is the wife of Li Jing and they have three sons, Jinzha, Muzha, and Nezha. She played a prominent role in the nurture of Nezha. According to legend, she is said to be the reincarnation of the second daughter of the Jade Emperor.

Her full name is Yin Wuming in the Fengshen Yanyi, and it is called Lady Yin in the Ming dynasty religious book .

In Fenshen Yanyi
Throughout the Nezha birth arc in Fengshen Yanyi, Lady Yin was pregnant again after three years and six months without giving birth. One day when she was sleeping, she dreamed that a deity Taiyi Zhenren put something into her arms; she woke up with pain in her abdomen and gave birth to a meat ball in the incense chamber. With a round like a wheel, Li Jing slashed at the meat ball with a sharp sword, and jumped out a child. 

She would always be known to reflect many acts of kindness to her third son—no matter what he truly did. Thus, Lady Yin would be seen protecting Nezha at many times throughout the novel, even when he performed horrendous actions such as the killing of Ao Guang's third son, Ao Bing. After Nezha had given his own body as a sacrifice to Ao Guang in order to protect his family, Lady Yin would end up erecting a temple atop the Green Screen Hill as a stationing area for Nezha's spirit (this was because Nezha continuously pleaded to her in her sleep). Lady Yin would be scolded by Li Jing profusely following this point.

In popular culture
 The character increased in popularity in 2019 with the stereoscopic, computer-animated feature film, Ne Zha, was more successful, setting numerous all-time records for box-office grosses, including third-highest-grossing of all films in China and highest-grossing animated film from outside the United States.

References

 Investiture of the Gods chapter 13-14

Investiture of the Gods characters